Tache noire de la sclerotique (French for Black spot of the sclera) is one of the ocular signs of death in which a reddish-brown discoloration is transversely arranged across the sclera. It occurs when the eyes are not completely closed so that the sclera is exposed to air. If the eyelids are open for a few hours after death, a film of cell debris and mucus forms two yellow triangles on the sclera, each at side of the iris, with base towards the margin of cornea and apex towards medial or lateral canthus of the eye, which becomes brown and then black within a few hours, upon which dust settles and the surface becomes wrinkled.

References

Signs of death